Paddleboard Yoga, invented by 2009, is the practice of modern yoga as exercise, and sometimes specific transitions between postures, while stand up paddleboarding, usually with the board in calm water, such as a lake. Beginners may practice this yoga hybrid on the beach or in a swimming pool to gain the strength and flexibility to maintain the balance necessary when the board is afloat. Beginners may practice a sequence of asanas either on a normal length surfboard or a specially designed stand up paddle board; some, described as "forgiving", are inflatable. Paddle board yoga is celebrated at the Wanderlust Festival in Hawaii. One of the pioneers of Paddleboard Yoga, Rachel Bråthén, lives and teaches yoga in the island of Aruba in the Caribbean Sea; she began teaching Paddleboard Yoga in 2009.

Reception

Alexa Pozniak, writing for Boston.com in 2013, contrasted Paddleboard Yoga with the "dimly lit studio[s]" and yoga mats of conventional yoga. Practising poses including Downward Dog in Beverly Harbor with its strong currents, each board was fitted with a small anchor. He noted that the style was both a "physical workout", the core muscles constantly working to keep the body balanced on the board, and "an exercise in mental focus". When he lost focus as he had often done on his yoga mat, his board "penaliz[ed him] for letting [his] mind wander" and, like what the instructor had described as "only about 10% of her students", he fell into the "chilly" water. All the same, Pozniak called the experience a "sensory adventure" with mewing seagulls, the ocean breeze, and the scent of salt water: both "soothing" and "energizing".

Lauren Ladoceour, in Yoga Journal in 2013, wrote that stand up paddleboarding was created in the 1940s by surfers at Waikiki in Hawaii. She described Paddleboard Yoga as bringing "a sense of joyful freedom to an otherwise earth-bound yoga practice." Classes began with kneeling poses like Cat-Cow, advancing to standing asanas such as Tree Pose. She quoted vinyasa yoga teacher and paddleboard racer Gillian Gibree as saying that the practice demands focus, both in the asanas and in the transitions between them. To avoid falling in, even on calm water, micromovements are needed, with the gaze on a fixed point. The Bikram yoga teacher Katie Fitzgerald adds that "falling is just part of the experience".

The travel writer Elizabeth Gowing, on her tour of the many kinds of yoga in Britain, described "Stand-up Paddleboard Yoga" in Nottingham, England, in 2019. She surprised herself at the end of an hour's tuition, which included Wild Thing Pose, by standing on her board in Warrior Pose.

References

External links 

 At CBS

Surfing
Paddling
Adventure tourism in India
Yoga styles
Yoga hybrids